La Cosiata, also known as the Revolution of the Morrocoyes, was a political separatist movement that broke out in the city of Valencia, Venezuela, carried out by General José Antonio Páez and Miguel Peña Páez on April 30, 1826, with the purpose of separating Venezuela from Gran Colombia.

Originally, the movement was aimed at demanding the reform of the Cúcuta Constitution and announcing the break with the authorities of Santa Fe de Bogotá, but with the intention of continuing under the protection of the Liberator Simón Bolívar. Others, however, conclude that these events could be seen coming from the birth of the Republic of Gran Colombia, since when it was constituted, a centralist-type system was adopted in the hands of the political and economic elites, the system of government had become in absolutist, coupled with this, the Venezuelan authorities had to be subject to the decision of the Senate of Gran Colombia (New Granada, Venezuela and Ecuador), in Peru and Bolivia there was news about a new constitution for life and this was not seen as a good decision, several regions including Venezuela asked for autonomy in decisions and it was not seen in theory that several years of independence struggle and achievements of freedom achieved on the battlefield were misused. This is the event that will ultimately mark the birth of the Republic of Venezuela.

Etymology 
The origin of this name by which this political movement is known is a bit strange in the eyes of those who seek its meaning, but according to research carried out by the historian, Professor José M. Ameliach N., reflected in his article "La Cosiata fue el principio del fin", edition of the newspaper El Informador de Barquisimeto, dated January 22, 2012, its etymological meaning stems from the characteristic of the Venezuelan population of the time that gave a certain name to some political eventuality, for that reason Then an Italian comedian had arrived in the country who used the word "Cosiata" in his presentations, to refer to theatrical events without importance or meaning, and since that was the fashionable word for the occasion, it turned out to be the one used as a review by the media.

Background 
In 1821 the promulgation of the Constitution of Cúcuta (Constitution of Gran Colombia) had caused discomfort among Venezuelans from the beginning, being sworn in Caracas under protest from the Municipality. The election of Francisco de Paula Santander for the Vice Presidency of the Republic, the choice of a centralist system instead of a federal one, and the election of Bogotá as the capital of the newly formed Union, were also points of great citizen discord, with the perception that Venezuela, which had not been favored with the decisions made. The central constitution, which could not be reformed before 10 years, provided for certain federal measures over time, but it depended on the people to abide by the Magna Carta and the law.

Motivated by the constant onslaught of royalist guerrillas, in a Venezuela that was undergoing a full recovery from the emancipatory war, and by the prevailing fear of a supposed "Holy Alliance" between France and Spain, through which a powerful army would be formed to reconquer America, Francisco de Paula Santander decreed on August 31, 1824 a general enlistment of all citizens between the ages of 16 and 50 in the country and demanded from the Department of Venezuela a contingent of 50,000 men to be sent to Bogotá.

For his part, General José Antonio Páez, who had been exercising the functions of General Commander of the Department of Venezuela (Caracas, Carabobo, Barquisimeto, Barinas and Apure) since 1822, delayed the execution of the decree for almost a year, fearful not only of a general mutiny, but to show their displeasure at the government's decisions. Subsequently, and due to the continuous pressure from Bogotá, he decided to accept the call for enlistment of the Venezuelans, which finally ended in resounding failure due to the recruitment of only 800 citizens, being forced to make a second and third call in collaboration with the Brigadier General Juan de Escalona (Intendant of the Department of Venezuela) ending these new attempts in bloody disturbances. Reports of excesses in recruitment reached the Municipal Council of Caracas, which led to an accusation that would prosper in the Senate of Bogotá.

The part of the facts did not take long for the news to reach the Gran-Colombian capital, immediately sending the corresponding documentation to present the report on the situation. Vice President Santander took advantage of the situation to request that Congress proceed with great prudence in the face of a political crisis that was affecting the relationship between Caracas and Bogotá, resorting to reminding the deputies of the brilliant career of General Páez and the need to count on his person if it was possible for the good of the Union. Páez is finally removed from his position as General Commander of the Department of Venezuela, being immediately called to Bogotá to face trial, by vote of the Senate.

This is how Páez hands over command to General Juan de Escalona, but Páez was advised, by Miguel Peña among others, who believed that his presence before the government of Santafé (Bogotá) would be the scaffold, Miguel Peña named facts of what occurred with Colonel Leonardo Infante, a Venezuelan officer who had been sentenced to be shot in March 1825, accused of the murder of Lieutenant Perdomo, but Miguel Peña, by refusing to sign the final sentence, had been suspended from his duties for one year. from March 24, 1825. Páez refuses to obey the order to move to Bogotá, finally residing in his house in the City of Valencia. Three months later a revolt of citizens arises in front of the Municipal Council of the locality, the next day the mayors declare that before the alteration of the public order that was taking place in the province it was necessary to bring Páez back to the leadership of the country. Faced with such a situation, José Antonio Páez declares himself in rebellion.

Bolívar, who had been re-elected President and upon learning of this situation, left Lima for Venezuela on September 4, 1826, arriving in Guayaquil on September 12 and Bogotá on November 16, then headed for Cartagena and from there by sea, arriving at Puerto Cabello on December 31, by January 19, 1827 in the same city, Bolívar had decreed a cloak of oblivion over the performances of the participants of "La Cosiata". Bolívar met with Páez, reaffirming his liberating union and the Liberator granted him a general amnesty and ratified José Antonio Páez Herrera as Civil and Military Chief of the department of Venezuela. However, the divisions between Venezuelan and New Granadan leaders increased in view of the delay in the constitutional reforms requested by the citizens, intensifying in subsequent years.

Bolívar returned to Santafé at the beginning of 1827, encountering strong resistance in the political circles that were grouped around General Santander. The trust that the Liberator placed in his closest military collaborators, mostly Venezuelans and British, and their frequent excesses, added one more reason to the differences between Bolívar and the members of Congress.

Foundation of the Republic of Venezuela 
On April 2, 1828, due to the movement initiated by General José Antonio Páez and others who also sought the revision of the Constitution of Gran Colombia, what is known as the Ocaña Convention was held with the aim of electing the Congress constituent that would modify the Constitution of Cúcuta. Those attending the convention were deputies from the Departments of Colombia, Ecuador, Panama and Venezuela, these in turn were formed into two factions, the Centralists led by Simón Bolívar and the Federalists led by Francisco de Paula Santander on the Colombian side and José Antonio Páez on the Venezuelan side, with the latter group having more followers.

Bolívar, with his fervent desire to see Gran Colombia united in the face of internal and external aggression, decides to impose his will, thus establishing a dictatorship as a last resort. In August 1828, he presented a new Constitution with a marked centralist accent and for the first time a presidential system for life in which he could have the power to appoint his successor. This was the final spark that ignited the spirits of those seeking secession, seeing that proposal as a return to the monarchical system that they had gotten rid of in the War of Independence against Spain; For this reason, multiple attempts to assassinate the Liberator arise.

On December 27, 1829, an assembly gathered in the Convent of San Francisco in Caracas disregarded the authority of Bolívar and the Colombian Government, handing over power to Páez who in an official letter let Bolívar know, which was read in a convention meeting in Bogotá for January 1830 where he urges him to accept the separation of Venezuela. This convention called the Admirable Congress was convened by the Liberator himself with the intention of reconciling the factions that had been created in the Republic and thus avoid the dissolution of Gran Colombia, so upon receiving the news from Venezuela, he requested dictatorial powers from Congress. to meet with Páez in Mérida (Venezuela) and remedy the crisis, but such permission was denied, for which Simón Bolívar finally resigned his position in that same month of January 1830.

Páez then decides to form a Provisional Government by becoming Head of the Administration and issues a decree where he calls for the election of deputies for a Constituent Congress that would meet in the city of Valencia on May 6, 1830, which culminated in the creation of the Republic of Venezuela and the establishment of Valencia as provisional capital.

The Constitution that was to govern the new Republic of Venezuela was sanctioned on September 22, 1830, entering into force that same month.

On March 24, 1831, the legal vote was taken to elect the President of the Republic, resulting in General José Antonio Páez Herrera being elected for the first constitutional period of four years as President of the Republic, who obtained 136 votes (86.07%) of the 158 voters who voted. The next day, voting was held to elect the first Vice President of the Republic, and since none of the candidates obtained a legal majority, the election was perfected and Mr. Diego Bautista Urbaneja was appointed for two years.

On April 11, 1831, General José Antonio Páez took the legal oath as Constitutional President of Venezuela; an excerpt from his speech that day upon taking office:

President Páez ruled with relative peace during his term, his government being made up mostly of high-ranking military veterans of the War of Independence, achieving a slight recovery of the economy devastated by the war, mainly due to the enactment of the Law of Freedom of Contracts of 1834 and the exports of Coffee. Without a doubt, under his direction the Republic was established (born under the command of the Conservative Party).

However, several revolutions had to be faced, such as the one led in Barcelona and Cumaná by General José Tadeo Monagas, the Pro-Monarchist Revolution of José Dionisio Cisneros and the Pro-Colombian Revolution of Cayetano Gabante, both in Guárico during 1834. Along with this faced serious difficulties of a religious order, with the Archbishop of Caracas, Doctor Ramón Ignacio Méndez, and a politician, sponsored by soldiers dissatisfied with not intervening directly in the public administration, others by civil groups and members of the university community who supported the candidacy civilista of the doctor José María Vargas despite his reluctance to accept his application.

Finally, in 1835, José Antonio Páez delegated power to José María Vargas, the first civilian to lead the country.

See also 

 Dissolution of Gran Colombia
 1827 Guayaquil sublevation

References

External links 

 Wikisource contains original sources about La Cosiata

Political movements in Venezuela
1820s in Venezuela
Valencia, Venezuela
Independence movements